Salford Reds is a proposed station on a new line of the Metrolink light rail system in Greater Manchester, England, close to Salford City Stadium, home to Salford Red Devils rugby league and Sale Sharks rugby union clubs.

The line has so far been constructed as far as  but this stop is not yet a committed scheme.

References
 Metrolink future network (archived version)

Proposed Manchester Metrolink tram stops